Katrine Louise Abel (born 28 June 1990) is a Danish football goalkeeper who plays for Brøndby IF of Denmark's Elitedivisionen. In 2015, she won her first cap for the senior Denmark national team.

Club career
Abel played 78 times in all competitions for Varde IF. She moved on to Taastrup FC, but became a free agent when the club withdrew from the Elitedivisionen in December 2013. In January 2014 Abel trained with reigning champions Brøndby IF and agreed a one-year contract with the club.

International career

As an uncapped player, Abel was called up to be part of the national team for UEFA Women's Euro 2013. She made her international debut for Denmark in January 2015, playing the second half of a 3–2 friendly defeat by New Zealand in Belek, Turkey.

Merits

Club 

 Brøndby IF

The Elite Division

 Gold: 2018-19
 Gold: 2016-17
 Gold: 2014-15
 Silver: 2017-18
 Silver: 2015-16

Sydbank Kvindepokalen

 Gold: 2018
 Gold: 2017
 Gold: 2015
 Silver: 2019
 Silver: 2016

References

External links
Profile at Danish Football Association 

1990 births
Living people
Danish women's footballers
Denmark women's international footballers
Brøndby IF (women) players
Women's association football goalkeepers